Venison Island is an island off of the coast of Labrador.

The island is separated from Stony Island by a narrow channel called Venison Tickle and measures 1200 m by 550 m. The island once had a busy wharf and fishing community, a wireless telegraph station (code VI) and a population of 36 year-round residents in 1901.

References

Islands of Newfoundland and Labrador